Eight auxiliary routes of Arkansas Highway 69 currently exist. Four are spur routes, with four serving as business routes.

Melbourne spur

Highway 69 Spur (AR 69S, Ark. 69S, or Hwy. 69S) is a spur route in Melbourne.

Route description
The route begins at Highway 69 in west Melbourne and runs east before turning north. The highway serves Melbourne Municipal Airport ending at the terminal.

Major intersections

Sage business route

Highway 69 Business (AR 69B, Ark. 69B, or Hwy. 69B) is a business route at Sage.

Route description
The route begins at Highway 69 just south of Melbourne and runs east before serving as the southern terminus for Highway 289 near Sage. Highway 69B turns south after sage and terminates at its parent at the start of the Highway 58/Highway 69 concurrency.

Major intersections

Batesville business route

Highway 69 Business (AR 69B, Ark. 69B, or Hwy. 69B) is a business route in Batesville.

Route description
The route begins at Highway 69 in northwest Batesville and runs south as Central Avenue. Highway 69B serves as the eastern terminus of Highway 106, passes the Luster Urban Farmstead (listed on the National Register of Historic Places [NRHP]) before crossing Polk Bayou on the Central Avenue Bridge, also NRHP-listed. The highway continues south along border of the Batesville Commercial Historic District before turning onto Boswell Street. Highway 69B runs past the historic Adler House before turning onto Harrison Street. Highway 69B continues along Harrison Street before terminating at U.S. Route 167/Highway 25/Highway 69 (US 167/AR 25/AR 69).

Major intersections

Batesville spur

Highway 69 Spur (AR 69S, Ark. 69S, or Hwy. 69S) is a spur route in Batesville.

Route description
The route begins at Highway 69 in Batesville and runs east to U.S. Route 167/Highway 25/Highway 69 (US 167/AR 25/AR 69).

Major intersections

Sulphur Rock business route

Highway 69 Business (AR 69B, Ark. 69B, or Hwy. 69B) is a business route in Sulphur Rock.

Route description
The route begins at Highway 69 in northwest Sulphur Rock and runs southeast as Broadway. Highway 69B serves as the northern terminus of Highway 233 before turning south and terminating at the parent route.

Major intersections

Newark business route

Highway 69 Business (AR 69B, Ark. 69B, or Hwy. 69B) is a business route in Newark.

Route description
The route begins at Highway 69 west of Newark and enters the city as 6th Street. Highway 69B serves as the southern terminus of Highway 233 and continues east to terminate at Highway 122.

Major intersections

Jacksonport spur

Highway 69 Spur (AR 69S, Ark. 69S, or Hwy. 69S) is a spur route in Jacksonport.

Route description
The route begins at Highway 69 in Jacksonport and runs southwest to as Avenue Street to Dillard Street at the edge of Jacksonport State Park.

Major intersections

Trumann spur

Highway 69 Spur (AR 69S, Ark. 69S, or Hwy. 69S) is a spur route in Trumann.

Route description
The route begins at Highway 69 in Trumann and runs south to as Ozark Avenue to Highway 463.

Major intersections

See also

Notes

References

069
069
Transportation in Izard County, Arkansas
Transportation in Independence County, Arkansas
Transportation in Jackson County, Arkansas
Transportation in Poinsett County, Arkansas